Events in the year 1844 in Norway.

Incumbents
Monarch: Charles III John (until 8 March); then Oscar I

Events
8 March – King Oscar I ascends to the throne of Sweden-Norway

Undated
1844 Norwegian parliamentary election
Utsira Lighthouse is established.

Arts and literature

Births
2 March – Ole Larsen Skattebøl, judge and politician (d.1929)
8 March – Jens Jonas Jansen, priest (d.1912)
22 March – Sven Oftedal, helped found the Lutheran Free Church (d.1911)
23 May – Klaus Hanssen, physician and politician
15 July – Thorbjorn N. Mohn, American Lutheran church leader and the first president of St. Olaf College (d. 1899)
8 August – Alf Collett, writer (d.1919)
11 September –  N. O. Nelson, founder of the N. O. Nelson Manufacturing Company (d. 1922)
2 October – Peter Harboe Castberg, banker (d.1926)
29 December – Brynild Anundsen, founder of Decorah Posten (d.1913)

Full date unknown
Oluf Hansen Hagen, politician
Nils Otto Hesselberg, politician (d.1929)
Christian Wilhelm Engel Bredal Olssøn, politician and Minister (d.1915)
Steinar Schjøtt, philologist and lexicographer (d.1920)
Oscar Wergeland, painter (d.1910)

Deaths
4 August – Jacob Aall, historian and statesman (b.1773)

See also

References